Panchaetothripinae is a subfamily of thrips in the family Thripidae, first described in 1912 by Richard Siddoway Bagnall. There are about 11 genera and more than 50 described species in Panchaetothripinae.

Genera
These 11 genera belong to the subfamily Panchaetothripinae:
 Anisopilothrips Stannard & Mitri, 1962
 Caliothrips Daniel, 1904
 Dinurothrips Hood, 1913
 Elixothrips Stannard & Mitri, 1962
 Heliothrips Haliday, 1836
 Hercinothrips Bagnall, 1932
 Hoodothrips Bondar, 1931
 Monilothrips Moulton, 1929
 Parthenothrips Uzel, 1895
 Retithrips Marchal, 1910
 Selenothrips Karny, 1911

References

Further reading

External links

Thripidae
Articles created by Qbugbot
Taxa named by Richard Siddoway Bagnall
Taxa described in 1912